Benzocyclobutadiene is the simplest polycyclic hydrocarbon, being composed of an aromatic benzene ring fused to an anti-aromatic cyclobutadiene ring.  It has chemical formula . Though the benzene ring is stabilized by aromaticity, the cyclobutadiene portion has a destabilizing effect. This results into it being a non-aromatic compound - neither behaving as aromatic nor an antiaromatic one. For this reason, benzocyclobutadiene will readily dimerize or polymerize and it reacts as a dienophile in Diels-Alder reactions.

Benzocyclobutadiene is used in the production of the pharmaceutical drug naflocort.

See also 
Pentalene

References

Polycyclic aromatic hydrocarbons
Bicyclic compounds
Four-membered rings